La Bazoque is a commune in the Calvados department in the Normandy region of north-western France.

The inhabitants of the commune are known as Bazocains or Bazocaines.

Geography
La Bazoque is located some 13 km east by north-east of Saint-Lô and 20 km south-west of Bayeux. The southern tip of the commune is the departmental border with Manche. Access to the commune is by the D229 from Litteau in the west which passes through the commune and the village and continues west to join the D28 south of Balleroy. The D122B from Litteau passes through the south of the commune and goes east then south towards Montrabot. The D122 road forms the whole western border of the commune. Apart from the village there are the hamlets of La Nellerie, Le Mesnil, La Londe, and Promenant. The commune is entirely farmland.

The Drôme river forms the eastern border of the commune as it flows north to join the Aure just north of Maisons. Several streams, including the Ruisseau de la Bindoure, flow through the commune and join the Drome.

Toponymy
La Bazoque appears as La Bazoque on the 1750 Cassini Map and the same on the 1790 version.

Administration

List of Successive Mayors

Demography
In 2017 the commune had 183 inhabitants.

Sites and monuments
The Trou du Diable: an old slate quarry
The Circuit of Shale
The Essarts Mill

See also
Communes of the Calvados department

References

Communes of Calvados (department)